The Petroleum Licensing (Production) (Seaward Areas) Regulations 2008 (SI 2008/225) are a group of regulations passed for the Petroleum Act 1998 that set out model clauses of a petroleum licence agreement, as amended by SI 2009/3283. These are necessary for companies drilling for oil in the United Kingdom.

Contents
In Schedule 1 of the Regulations, the model clauses are as follows. 

cl 2, for the grant of a licence payments are to be made 
cl 4, potential for discretionary decision by Minister on term of the licence
cl 5, potential for ministerial direction that a frontier licence that is going to lapse should continue
cl 7, power to determine that a first or second licence term should be extended
cl 14, power to direct that measuring devices be tested, and find how long a fault subsisted
cl 16, licensee’s obligation to submit work programmes
cl 17, licensee obligation to submit production and development programmes (Gordon (2012) ch 5). Minister has the power to make directives relative to production and development. 
cl 21, power to approve a programme of Completion Work
cl 23, Minister consent to potentially harmful modes of working
cl 24, power to approve appointment of an operator
cl 41, Minister’s power of revocation, upon breach of the license terms 
cl 42, Minister’s power of partial-revocation 
cl 43, arbitration clause. (1) This does not apply to anything to be ‘determined.... by the Minister’. 
cl 45, power to determine that debris is potentially dangerous to fishing industry and should be removed.

See also
UK enterprise law

Notes

United Kingdom enterprise law